The George Washington Hotel is a historic hotel located in downtown Winchester, Virginia. It was built in 1924 by The American Hotel Corporation, as part of their "Colonial Chain" of hotels. Like many hotels of the era, the property was built in close proximity of a B&O train station and was constructed to provide lodging to railroad passengers.

History

Early years
Opened in 1924, the five-story hotel was originally built in the shape of an "L", with a rear one-story kitchen wing. It contained 102 rooms and 45 baths. The lowest level contained a barber-shop, cafeteria, candy shop and men's furnishing shop. In 1929, an additional wing was added to the hotel, providing 50 more guestrooms and giving the structure the shape of a "C". In 1950 the hotel was remodeled to include a Howard Johnson's restaurant. The George Washington was the headquarters of the Shenandoah Apple Blossom Festival. Notable guests include Lucille Ball, Jack Dempsey among many others.

Decline
With the construction of interstate highways and the dominance of cars, railroad travel began to decline. This contributed to the closure of the hotel in 1978. It operated as a retirement home - The George Washington Home for Adults - from 1978 to 1993. The property then remained vacant for eleven years.

Restoration
In 2004, the George Washington was purchased and restored, reopening in April 2008. It was listed on the National Register of Historic Places in 2010. It has 90 guestrooms, an indoor pool and hot tub, fitness room, restaurant "Georges Food And Spirits". The hotel is managed by Wyndham Hotels as The George Washington – A Wyndham Grand Hotel.

References

External links

 

Baltimore and Ohio Railroad
Buildings and structures in Winchester, Virginia
Colonial Revival architecture in Virginia
Hotel buildings on the National Register of Historic Places in Virginia
Hotels established in 1924
Hotels in Virginia
National Register of Historic Places in Winchester, Virginia
Washington, George (Winchester, Virginia)
Wyndham Destinations
Hotels established in 2008
1924 establishments in Virginia
1978 disestablishments in Virginia
2008 establishments in Virginia
Hotel buildings completed in 1924